Kavarapattu is a village in the Orathanadu taluk of Thanjavur district, Tamil Nadu, India.

Demographics 

As per the 2001 census, Kavarapattu had a total population of 1232 with 558 males and 674 females. The sex ratio was 1208. The literacy rate was 60.9. The current Panchayat president is Devendiran.

References 

 

Villages in Thanjavur district